Wenn das die Nachbarn wüßten   is an Austrian television series.

See also 
List of Austrian television series

External links 
 

Austrian television series
1990 Austrian television series debuts
1992 Austrian television series endings
ORF (broadcaster)
1990s Austrian television series
German-language television shows